Nicole Melichar and Demi Schuurs were the defending champions but Schuurs chose not to participate. Melichar played alongside Vivian Heisen, but they lost in the semifinals to Alexa Guarachi and Desirae Krawczyk.

Guarachi and Krawczyk went on to win the title, defeating Makoto Ninomiya and Yang Zhaoxuan in the final, 6–2, 6–3.

Seeds

Draw

Draw

References

External Links 
Main Draw

2021 WTA Tour
2021 Internationaux de Strasbourg – Doubles
2021 in French tennis